My Magic is a 2008 Singaporean Tamil language drama film directed by Eric Khoo and produced by Zhao Wei Films in association with Infinite Frameworks.  My Magic was the first Singapore film to be nominated for the Palme D'Or, the top award for film at the Cannes Film Festival. It has been also selected as Singapore's official entry for the Oscars in 2009. It was released in Singapore cinemas on 25 September 2008.

Plot 
A single father takes a job as a magician to provide for his son, only to be pressured into dangerous acts.

Cast 
 Bosco Francis
 Jathisweran as Rajr
 Grace Kalaiselvi
 Jason Lim
 Seet Keng-yew

Reception 
Derek Elley of Variety wrote that it "walks a thin line ... between sympathy with and exploitation of its main character's woes".  Maggie Lee of The Hollywood Reporter called it a "one trick pony" that engages in schadenfreude and sentimentality instead of living up to the premise's possibilities as a heartbreaking father-son story.

Bosco Francis was named best actor at the Asian Festival of First Films.

References

External links
 
 
 

2008 films
2008 drama films
2000s Tamil-language films
Singaporean drama films
Films directed by Eric Khoo